The Alesis Quadrasynth is a 76-key, 64-note polyphonic PCM sample-based digital subtractive synthesizer first introduced in 1993. It was Alesis's first major foray into synthesizer production.

Function
In the Quadrasynth's composite synthesis system, up to four "tones" are used to create a single "patch" or synthesizer sound. These individual "tones" are created by using 16-bit digital single-cycle waveforms or digital samples as oscillator sources, and are then processed via a digital non-resonant filter, various LFOs and envelope generators, and so on - in the usual manner. The Quadrasynth contained 16MB of ROM containing PCM-based waveforms and samples, with the option of expanding the sample base via PCMCIA expansion cards which plug into the back of the synthesizer.

A "patch" on the Quadrasynth can contain 1, 2, 3 or 4 of these tones. However, polyphony decreases as more tones are used. For example, a 1-tone patch would have 64-note polyphony, a 2-tone patch would have 32-note polyphony, and a 4-tone patch would only have 16-note polyphony. Patches can only be stored in the User bank. All other banks are factory presets which cannot be overwritten. The Quadrasynth was typical of synthesizers of the early 90s, featuring a digital, menu-based editing system. Editing user patches could be tedious if the user is unfamiliar with its complex editing structure or has not read the manual.

A multitimbral "mix" (or "performance") can contain up to 16 parts (patches). Each part can respond to the full range of the keyboard or to a configured subrange, which allows for layering and splitting. Each patch in a mix corresponds to a different MIDI channel, so that the Quadrasynth can become a multitimbral playback device for external sequencers or MIDI file players. The Quadrasynth also had a 4-bus multi effects processor, which is based on Alesis' own Quadraverb 2 stand-alone effects processor. A main function of the synthesizer is its ability to output in Quadraphonic, on the rear of the keyboard .

History
In 1995, Alesis gave the Quadrasynth an upgrade with the QuadraSynth Plus. It had more ROM (24MB), plus many more program patches. The General MIDI library was added, as well as an 8MB stereo Grand Piano sample.

In 1996, Alesis introduced the first of their QS series synthesizers. The first of these were the QS6 61-key synth and the QSR rackmount synth. Following these in quick succession were the QS7 76-key synth and the QS8 88-key synth (the flagship of the series). Essentially, the QS synths' architecture is still based on the original Quadrasynth, but with the important addition of a modulation matrix, allowing users to assign virtually any controller source to any modulation parameter. Many of the sounds in the Preset and User banks were re-written, and new samples were created, including samples of Keith Emerson's infamous Yamaha GX1 synthesizer. Emerson even wrote new patches for it, and demonstrated the new QS8 at a release party for Alesis in 1996.

In 1998, Alesis upgraded the QS line with the QS6.1, QS7.1 and QS8.1, which were basically the same as the original QS line, except that Alesis created a new 8MB Bosendorfer Stereo Grand Piano sample for them. Also, a bigger LCD screen, and a few extra assignable sliders (for performance tweaking) were included.

In 2003, Alesis decided to keep the QS series alive with the QS6.2 and QS8.2 (there was no 76-key version). This happened after Alesis declared bankruptcy in 2001 and was acquired by Numark. Basically, the x.2 line is identical to the x.1 line but with many stripped-down hardware options. There is now no ADAT port, no multiple outs (only a stereo pair), only one PCMCIA expansion slot, and no aftertouch on the 88-key model. The only other differences are a new brushed-aluminum casing (replacing the original black metal casing), plastic end-caps instead of oak (on the 88-key models), ergonomic placing of cursor buttons, and 24-bit effects and DAC's.

References

Further reading

External links
 https://web.archive.org/web/20070703085221/http://www.vintagesynth.com/index2.html
 http://www.midiworld.com/quadrasynth/index.htm

Alesis synthesizers
Polyphonic synthesizers
Digital synthesizers